The Fourth Avenue/Ninth Street station is a New York City Subway station complex shared by the elevated IND Culver Line and the underground BMT Fourth Avenue Line. It is located at the intersection of Ninth Street and Fourth Avenue in Park Slope, Brooklyn and served by the:
 ,  and  trains at all times
  and  trains late nights
 W train during rush hours only, with some trips in the peak direction

The Ninth Street portion of the station was constructed as part of the Fourth Avenue Line, which was approved in 1905. Construction on the segment of the line that includes Union Street started on December 20, 1909, and was completed in September 1912. The station opened on June 22, 1915, as part of the initial portion of the BMT Fourth Avenue Line to 59th Street. The station's platforms were lengthened in 1926–1927, and again in 1970. The Fourth Avenue portion was built as part of the Culver Line of the city-operated Independent Subway System, and was constructed as an elevated station so the line could pass over the Gowanus Canal to the west. This station opened on October 7, 1933. The two stations were consolidated into a single station complex on May 28, 1959.



History

Fourth Avenue Line

Construction and opening 
The Ninth Street station was constructed as part of the Fourth Avenue Line, and was the first part of this station complex to open. The plan for the line was initially adopted on June 1, 1905. The Rapid Transit Commission was succeeded on July 1, 1907, by the New York State Public Service Commission (PSC), which approved the plan for the line in late 1907. The contract for the section of the line that included the Ninth Street station, Route 11A2, which extended from 10th Street to Sackett Street, was awarded on May 22, 1908, to the E.E. Smith Construction Company for $2,296,234.93. The New York City Board of Estimate approved the contract on October 29, 1909. Construction on the segment started on December 20, 1909, and was completed in September 1912.

As part of negotiations between New York City, the Brooklyn Rapid Transit Company (BRT), and the Interborough Rapid Transit Company for the expansion of the city's transit network, the line was leased to a subsidiary of the BRT. The agreement, known as Contract 4 of the Dual Contracts, was signed on March 19, 1913. Ninth Street opened on June 22, 1915, as part of an extension of the subway to Coney Island, which included the Fourth Avenue Line north of 59th Street as well as the entire Sea Beach Line. The station's opening was marked with a competition between two trains heading from Chambers Street station in Manhattan to the Coney Island station, one heading via the West End Line and the other via the Sea Beach Line; the latter got to Coney Island first.

1920s platform extensions 
On June 27, 1922, the New York State Transit Commission directed its engineers to prepare plans to lengthen the platforms at 23 stations on the lines of the Brooklyn–Manhattan Transit Corporation (BMT), the successor to the BRT, to accommodate eight-car trains. Though the Transit Commission ordered the BMT to lengthen these platforms in September 1923, progress on the extensions did not occur until February 16, 1925, when the New York City Board of Transportation (NYCBOT) directed its engineers to prepare plans to lengthen the platforms at this and eleven other stations along the Fourth Avenue Line. It estimated the project's cost to be $633,000. The NYCBOT received bids for the project on February 25, 1926. The contract was awarded to the Corson Construction Company for $345,021. The extensions opened on August 1, 1927.

Culver Line
The Fourth Avenue station was constructed as part of the Culver (South Brooklyn) Line of the Independent Subway System (IND). One of the goals of Mayor John Hylan's IND, proposed in the 1920s, was a line to Coney Island, reached by a recapture of the BMT Culver Line. As originally designed, service to and from Manhattan would have been exclusively provided by Culver express trains, while all local service would have fed into the IND Crosstown Line.

In 1925, the IND finalized plans to build the line. The line's path crossed the Gowanus Canal, and the IND originally wanted to build a deep-river tunnel under the canal. To save money, the IND built a viaduct over the canal instead, resulting in the creation of the only above-ground section of the original IND. The first section of the line opened on March 20, 1933, from Jay Street to Bergen Street. The line was extended from Bergen Street to Church Avenue on October 7, 1933, including the Fourth Avenue station.

Station complex and subsequent years
The city government took over the BMT's operations on June 1, 1940. A free transfer point was established between the two stations on May 28, 1959 to compensate for the loss of through Culver service via the Fourth Avenue Line.

Fourth Avenue Line renovation 
In July 1959, the New York City Transit Authority (NYCTA) announced that it would install fluorescent lighting at the Ninth Street station and five other stations along the Fourth Avenue Line for between $175,000 and $200,000. Bids on the project were to be advertised on August 7, 1959 and completed by fall 1960.

On July 14, 1967, the NYCTA awarded a contract to conduct test borings at eleven stations on the Fourth Avenue Line, including Ninth Street, to the W. M. Walsh Corporation for $6,585 in preparation of the construction of platform extensions. The NYCTA issued an invitation for bids on the project to extend the platforms at stations along the Fourth Avenue Line between Pacific Street and 36th Street, including those at Ninth Street, on March 28, 1969. Funding for the renovation projects came out of the NYCTA's 1969–1970 Capital Budget, costing $8,177,890 in total.

As part of the renovation project, the station's platforms were extended, and the station's elaborate mosaic tile walls were covered over with  white cinderblock tiles. The latter change, which was also made to 15 other stations on the BMT Broadway and Fourth Avenue Lines, was criticized for being dehumanizing. The NYCTA spokesman stated that the old tiles were in poor condition and that the change was made to improve the appearance of stations and provide uniformity. Furthermore, it did not consider the old mosaics to have "any great artistic merit".

Culver Viaduct renovation 
In 2007, the Metropolitan Transportation Authority (MTA) announced a three-year renovation project of the elevated Culver Viaduct. The work area covers from south of Carroll Street to north of Ditmas Avenue. For Phase 2A of the project, a temporary platform was built over the southbound express track to allow northbound trains to stop at the station. The platform was then removed for Phase 2B. For Phase 3A a temporary platform was built over the northbound express track to allow southbound trains to stop. Reconstruction of the Fourth Avenue station was completed in April 2013. As part of the project, the arch bridge over Fourth Avenue was restored with the elimination of billboards and the removal of paint over the windows. The station received a public address system as part of the project. In addition, the MTA reopened the east station house to the station, after it had been closed for over 40 years.

Before 2009, G service terminated at Smith–Ninth Streets, one stop to the north. Terminating southbound trains used the switches just west of Fourth Avenue to enter the southbound express tracks. After being stored on the southbound express track, the G trains would start their Queens-bound runs by using the switches to enter the northbound local track. The switches were taken out of regular service in 2009, when the viaduct's reconstruction started and the G was extended to Church Avenue.

Station layout

Exits 

This station has five entrances. There is one entrance each in the vestibules on both sides of 4th Avenue between 9th and 10th Streets. There is also an entrance on the north side of 10th Street west of Fourth Avenue, which leads to the southbound BMT Fourth Avenue Line and both IND Culver Line platforms. The other two are entrances on either northern corner of 4th Avenue and 9th Street, and lead directly to the BMT Fourth Avenue Line platforms.

IND Culver Line platforms 

The Fourth Avenue station is a local station on the IND Culver Line that has four tracks and two side platforms. It is one of the only two elevated stations in the original IND system. Both platforms have tan brick windscreens and column-less cantilevered windscreens along their entire lengths except for a small portion of the west (railroad north) end. Above Fourth Avenue, the platform walls consist of massive steel arches with glass panes; each arch is anchored between two limestone-and-brick piers, one on either side of the arch. Running along the top of the arches are straight brick piers with patterns. The windows were formerly painted over, and billboards affixed to the outside of each arch; these were removed in the 2012 renovation.

The station has a crew quarters structure over both platforms which is constructed of buff brick with evidence of covered windows. These structures contain granite bases. Characteristic of the Art Deco style, the crew quarters towers contain small setbacks. Repeating chevron designs are located along the center of each tower, while limestone bands are located atop the parapets and setbacks on each tower.

This station's fare control area is at street level underneath the platforms and tracks and built within the viaduct's concrete structure. Two staircases from each platform go down to an I-shaped mezzanine (where mosaics reading "MEN" and "WOMEN" for two now-closed restrooms are visible) before three staircases go down to the turnstile bank. Outside fare control, there is a token booth and two sets of entry/exit doors, one to the west side of Fourth Avenue directly underneath the viaduct and the other to the north side of Tenth Street. Both entrances have their original lit-up IND "SUBWAY" sign while mosaic direction tiles reading "To Coney Island" and "To Manhattan" are in the mezzanine. Storefronts are located inside the viaduct at ground level.

The western fare control area has a single staircase going down to the extreme south end of the Bay Ridge-bound platform of Ninth Street on the BMT Fourth Avenue Line. The extreme east (railroad south) ends of each platform have a single staircase going down to the entrance to the east side of Fourth Avenue underneath the viaduct at ground level. Another staircase from this eastern landing goes down to the Manhattan-bound platform of Ninth Street. The staircase and mezzanine areas have yellow-tiled walls, with tile accents of green.

West of this station was a short stub-end reversing spur entered only from this station. It remained level between the two express tracks while the other tracks ramped up toward Smith–Ninth Streets. The track was removed during overhaul of the Culver Viaduct from 2007 to 2013. East of this station, the line enters a tunnel toward Seventh Avenue. That station is underground, but at a higher altitude than this elevated station due to the steep slope of the land (hence the neighborhood name of Park Slope).

Service patterns 
The station was originally served by the A train. In 1936, the A was rerouted to the IND Fulton Street Line and was replaced by E trains from the Queens Boulevard Line. Following the completion of the Culver Ramp in 1954,  Concourse Express trains replaced F service to Coney Island. In November 1967, the Chrystie Street Connection opened and D trains were rerouted via the Manhattan Bridge and the BMT Brighton Line to Coney Island. F trains were extended once again via the Culver Line.

The station acted as a local-only station from 1968 to 1976, when F trains ran express in both directions between Bergen Street and Church Avenue during rush hours. G trains were extended from Smith–Ninth Streets to Church Avenue to provide local service. Express service between Bergen and Church ended in 1976 due to budgetary concerns and passenger complaints, and the GG, later renamed the G, was again terminated at the Smith–Ninth Streets station.

In July 2009, the G was extended from its long-time terminus at Smith–Ninth Streets to a more efficient terminus at Church Avenue to accommodate the rehabilitation of the Culver Viaduct. The G extension was made permanent in July 2012. In July 2019, the MTA revealed plans to restore express service on the Culver Line between Jay Street and Church Avenue. Express service started on September 16, 2019.

Gallery

BMT Fourth Avenue Line platforms 

The Ninth Street station on the BMT Fourth Avenue Line is a local station that has four tracks and two side platforms. White tiled curtain walls separate the express tracks from the local tracks.

Beige columns run along both platforms at the station's northern end where they were extended in 1970. The ceiling is lower in this section.

Prior to the station's 1970 renovation, it was finished all in white and marble tile, and it had its own color scheme to allow regular passengers to identify the station based only on the color of the marble trimmings. Since the renovation, the station walls have consisted of white cinderblock tiles, except for small recesses in the walls, which contain yellow-painted cinderblock tiles. The yellow cinderblock field contains the station-name signs and black text pointing to the exits.

Each platform has one same-level fare control area in the middle. The one on the Manhattan-bound platform has a turnstile bank, token booth, and one staircase going up to the northeast corner of Ninth Street and Fourth Avenue. This fare control area still has the station's original trim line with "9" tablets at regular intervals. The fare control area on the Bay Ridge-bound platform is unstaffed, containing one High Entry/Exit Turnstile, one exit-only turnstile, a row of four low turnstiles, and a staircase to the northwest corner of Ninth Street and Fourth Avenue. A small section of the original trim line is visible here as well.

At the extreme south end of both platforms, staircases lead up to exit/entrance areas at street level. The exit/entrance area on the Manhattan-bound (eastern) side of the station was closed for around 40 years before being reopened in February 2012. On each side, staircases go up to either of the IND platforms at Fourth Avenue.

Gallery

References

External links 

 
 
 Station Reporter — 4th Avenue/Ninth Street Complex
 The Subway Nut — 9th Street (M, R) Pictures
 The Subway Nut — 4th Avenue (F, G) Pictures
 Ninth Street entrance from Google Maps Street View
 Fourth Avenue west entrance under viaduct from Google Maps Street View
 Fourth Avenue east entrance under viaduct from Google Maps Street View
 Other entrance on 10th Street from Google Maps Street View
 IND platforms from Google Maps Street View
 BMT platform from Google Maps Street View

IND Culver Line stations
BMT Fourth Avenue Line stations
New York City Subway transfer stations
Park Slope
New York City Subway stations in Brooklyn
Railway and subway stations on the National Register of Historic Places in New York City
Railway stations in the United States opened in 1915